Porkeri Church is a church in the settlement of Porkeri in the Faroe Islands. Porkeri is situated on the island of Suðuroy, which is the southernmost of the islands. It is a wooden church and it has a roof of turf. The church dates from 1847 and contains things donated by seamen who survived lethal storms on the sea, maintaining the tradition of almissu (seamen in danger promised, according to Nordic tradition, to donate to churches or to God if they got back home alive).

External Links 
 The Tourist Information in Suðuroy, info about churches in Suduroy.
 The Faroes National Museum

References 
 Porkeris Kirkja 1847-1997 Book written in Faroese about the Church of Porkeri, published on its 150th anniversary.

Churches in the Faroe Islands
Churches completed in 1847
1847 establishments in the Faroe Islands